Michler's ketone is an organic compound with the formula of [(CH3)2NC6H4]2CO. This electron-rich derivative of benzophenone is an intermediate in the production of dyes and pigments, for example Methyl violet. It is also used as a photosensitizer. It is named after the German chemist Wilhelm Michler.

Synthesis
The ketone is prepared today as it was originally by Michler using the Friedel-Crafts acylation of dimethylaniline (C6H5NMe2) using phosgene (COCl2) or equivalent reagents such as triphosgene
COCl2  +  2 C6H5NMe2   →   (Me2NC6H4)2CO  +  2 HCl →  salt
The related tetraethyl compound (Et2NC6H4)2CO, also a precursor to dyes, is prepared similarly.

Uses
Michler's ketone is an intermediate in the synthesis of dyes and pigments for paper, textiles, and leather. Condensation with various aniline derivatives gives several of the dyes called methyl violet, such as crystal violet.

Condensation of Michler's ketone with N-phenyl-1-naphthylamine gives the dye Victoria Blue B (CAS#2580-56-5, CI Basic Blue 26), which is used for coloring paper and producing pastes and inks for ballpoint pens.

Michler's ketone is commonly used as an additive in dyes and pigments as a sensitizer for photoreactions because of its absorption properties. Michler's ketone is an effective sensitizer provided energy transfer is exothermic and the concentration of the acceptor is sufficiently high to quench the photoreaction of Michler's ketone with itself. Specifically Michler's ketone absorbs intensely at 366 nm and effectively sensitizes photochemical reactions such as the dimerization of butadiene to give 1,2-divinylcyclobutane.

Related compounds
p-Dimethylaminobenzophenone is related to Michler's ketone, but with only one amine.  Auramine O, a dye, is a salt of the iminium cation [(CH3)2NC6H4]2CNH2+.  Michler's thione, [(CH3)2NC6H4]2CS, is prepared by treatment of Michler's ketone with hydrogen sulfide in the presence of acid or sulfideing auramine O.  Hydride reduction of Michler's ketone gives 4,4'-bis(dimethylamino)benzhydrol.

References

Printing
Benzophenones
Anilines
Dimethylamino compounds